The 2004 Four Continents Figure Skating Championships was an international figure skating competition in the 2003–04 season. It was held at the Copps Coliseum in Hamilton, Canada on January 19–25. Medals were awarded in the disciplines of men's singles, ladies' singles, pair skating, and ice dancing. The compulsory dance was the Yankee Polka.

Medals table

Results

Men

Ladies

Pairs

Ice dancing

External links

 

Four Continents Figure Skating Championships, 2004
Four Continents Figure Skating Championships
Sports competitions in Hamilton, Ontario
Four Continents